Fort Leavenworth Military Prison Cemetery (also known as the United States Disciplinary Barracks Cemetery) is a cemetery maintained by the Fort Leavenworth Military Prison, Leavenworth County, Kansas. The purpose of this cemetery is for the burial of unclaimed bodies of soldiers who died in the United States Disciplinary Barracks.
It is the final resting place for 298 soldiers who died in the prison, 58 of which lie in unmarked graves. The majority of the soldiers who are buried in Fort Leavenworth Military Prison Cemetery died between 1898 and 1905. The last known burial in the cemetery was in 1957, ten years after the one preceding it. Since families are expected to claim the bodies, the U.S. military does not have any plan for future burials.

Fourteen German prisoners of war who were executed in 1945 (for the murders of fellow-POWs Johannes Kunze, Horst Günther and Werner Drechsler) in the military prison are buried in the northwest corner of the cemetery.

See also
 List of people executed by the United States military

References

Fort Leavenworth
Military cemeteries in the United States
Protected areas of Leavenworth County, Kansas
Cemeteries in Kansas